Lars Stubhaug (born 18 April 1990) is a Norwegian footballer. He has previously played for Everton, Strømsgodset, Hønefoss and Rosenborg.

Before the 2013-season Stubhaug decide to retire form football to study economy in Bergen.

In April 2013, he signed a short-term contract with Strømsgodset.

Career statistics

References

1990 births
Living people
People from Haugesund
Norwegian footballers
Everton F.C. players
Strømsgodset Toppfotball players
SK Vard Haugesund players
Hønefoss BK players
Association football goalkeepers
Sportspeople from Rogaland